The 1906–07 Auburn Tigers men's basketball team represented Auburn University during the 1906–07 Intercollegiate Athletic Association of the United States college basketball season. The team captain was C.W. Woodruff.

Schedule

|-

References

Auburn Tigers men's basketball seasons
Auburn
Auburn Tigers men's basketball team
Auburn Tigers men's basketball team